Rafid Topan Sucipto (born August 24, 1994 in Jakarta, Indonesia), also known professionally as Rafid Topan, is an Indonesian motorcycle racer. He races a Yamaha YZF-R25 in the Asia Road Racing Championship class AP250. In 2015 he raced in the Asia Road Race SS600 Championship aboard a Suzuki GSX-R600. He previously competed in the Moto2 World Championship for QMMF Racing Team.

Career

Early years
Topan began motorcycle racing a bit later than most professionals, starting at 13 years of age. He won his rookie year in Novice category of the Indonesian national championship in both 2007 and 2008, and clinching the Expert title in 2009. In 2011, Topan won the Underbone title of the PETRONAS Asia Road Racing Championship, whilst in 2012 he made his Supersport 600cc debut.

Moto2 World Championship
At the end of 2012 Supicito substituted for Anthony West in the QMMF Racing team in Moto2 and impressed the team sufficiently to be offered a ride alongside West for 2013. Topan was ranked 30th in 2013 Moto2 season, with his best finishing position of 20th at Phillip Island and qualified 5th at Twin Ring Motegi.

Topan was selected by Forward Racing to replace their injured rider, Stefano Manzi, in the 2018 Malaysian motorcycle Grand Prix. This marks his first Moto2 appearance after being absent from the championship for 5 years. He managed to finish the race in 26th position.

CEV Moto2 European Championship
Topan participated in the 2016 FIM CEV Moto2 European Championship and also in the CEV Superstock 600 European Championship. On his debut race in Circuit de Barcelona-Catalunya on 12 June 2016, he finished 14th overall in the first race and 20th overall in the second race. Despite his overall finishes, he was classified as winner on both races for the Superstock 600 class.

Career statistics

Indoprix

Races by year
(key) (Races in bold indicate pole position; races in italics indicate fastest lap)

FIM CEV Moto2 European Championship

Races by year
(key)

FIM CEV Superstock 600 European Championship

Races by year
(key)

* Season still in progress

Grand Prix motorcycle racing

By season

By class

Races by year
(key)

Asia Production 250

Races by year
(key) (Races in bold indicate pole position; races in italics indicate fastest lap)

References

External links

1994 births
Moto2 World Championship riders
Living people
Indonesian motorcycle racers